South Wilford was a civil parish in Nottinghamshire from 1894 to 1935.  It was formed under the Local Government Act 1894 from the parts of the parishes of Wilford and Lenton which were not part of the county borough of Nottingham.  It formed part of the Basford Rural District.

In 1935, under a County Review Order, the parish became part of the West Bridgford urban district.  The part of the parish west of the railway line was added to the city of Nottingham in 1952.

References
http://www.visionofbritain.org.uk/relationships.jsp?u_id=10055222

Former civil parishes in Nottinghamshire